Joseph Restani (born October 3, 1997) is an American soccer player who currently plays for Project 51O in USL League Two.

Career

Youth & High School 
Restani played high school soccer at Pleasant Grove High School, leading the team in scoring. He also played basketball and served as a football kicker. Restani spent time playing club soccer with FC Elk Grove, where he scored 32 goals in three seasons, before joining the Sacramento Republic academy for the 2015-16 season, scoring 13 goals to help the team to the USSDA playoff quarterfinals.

College & Amateur
In 2016, Restani attended Saint Mary's College of California to play college soccer. In four seasons with the Gaels, Restani made 63 appearances, scoring 23 goals. Restani earned honors at Saint Mary's including All-WCC Academic Team Honorable Mention on three occasions, and Second Team All-WCC in his senior season.

In 2019 during his senior year, Restani also played in the NPSL side Sacramento Gold, scoring four goals during a 10–3 win over Sonoma County Sol.

Professional 
In 2020, Restani played with NPSL side Project 51O, the reserve team of Oakland Roots, scoring on his debut before the season went on to be cancelled due to the COVID-19 pandemic.

On July 23, 2021, Restani signed with USL Championship side Oakland Roots. He made his professional debut two days later, appearing as a 73rd-minute substitute during a 3–0 loss to LA Galaxy II.

References

External links 
 Joseph Restani - Men's Soccer SMC bio

1997 births
American soccer players
Association football forwards
Living people
National Independent Soccer Association players
Oakland Roots SC players
People from Elk Grove, California
Sacramento Gold FC players
Saint Mary's Gaels men's soccer players
Soccer players from California
USL Championship players